The Textile Labelling Act (Germany) ( Lit:"Law on the designation of textiles", short TextilKennzG) is a German federal law which was decreed on 1 April 1969. The law was completely rewritten and the new version was announced on 14 August 1986. The law was last changed by decree on 14 November 2006.

This law is part of the German consumer protection. Textiles to be commercially sold in Germany, commercially imported into Germany or produced to be sold in Germany have to have a label indicating the type and fraction based on weight of the textile raw materials it is composed of. Also any catalogue, brochure or other type of commercial have to state the composition of the textiles to be sold. There are certain rules on how to determine the weight fractions and how to calculate them.

Textiles in the context of this law is any good, fabric, part of mattress or camping good, lining of shoes and gloves, floor-covering and many other goods which consist of at least 80% textile raw materials. Textile raw materials are filaments or hairs which can be spun, including bands and flexible tubes not wider than 5mm.

For example, if a T-shirt consists of 80% cotton and 20% elastane this has to be declared on the label of the garment. If the shirt consists of 100% cotton one can choose between "100% cotton" or "completely made of cotton" or "pure cotton". For things made of wool and silk there are special regulations. Annex One of the law regulates the denomination of the various filaments.

In Annex Three there is a list of things that do not need a label indicating their composition, such as wristbands for watches, labels, artificial flowers, etc. Annex Four lists products that don't need a label but just an indication of their composition at the site of sale. These are especially things which are traditionally sold per meter like elastic tape.

If one violates the prescription on labelling textiles he can fined up to 5,000.00 Euros.

One does not have to declare the country of production on labels. This declaration is optional. Care instructions are printed on labels for liability- and compensation-prevention and are also optional.

External links 
 Textilkennzeichnungsgesetz full text 

German business law
Textile industry of Germany